The castra of Crâmpoia was a fort in the Roman province of Dacia. It was made of earth in the 2nd century AD. The Romans abandoned the fort in the 3rd century. Its ruins are located in Crâmpoia, Romania.

See also
List of castra

Notes

External links
Roman castra from Romania - Google Maps / Earth

Roman legionary fortresses in Romania
History of Muntenia
Historic monuments in Olt County